Incidental memory is memory for non-intentional memory - memory for information people are not asked to remember. In tests for incidental memory, people see/hear some information (often secondary to another task that the person is performing) and are then asked to recall (or recognize) the information despite the lack of prior effort made to memorize the information. Tests of incidental memory are often used to examine the Levels-of-processing effect.

Incidental memory was first measured by Raymond B. Willoughby of Clark University. He found that performance on incidental memory increased from childhood to age 13, and then decreased from age 13 to old age.

References

Memory